Yerko Antonio Ljubetic Godoy (born 20 August 1960) is a Chilean lawyer and politician who served as minister during Ricardo Lagos' government (2000–2006).

References

1960 births
Living people
Chilean people
20th-century Chilean lawyers
Chilean people of Croatian descent
University of Chile alumni
20th-century Chilean politicians
21st-century Chilean politicians
Christian Democratic Party (Chile) politicians
Izquierda Autónoma politicians
Members of the Autonomist Movement
Social Convergence politicians